Turkish television series have seen significant growth since the 2000s. These dramas are believed to reflect Turkish culture and considered by some to be the country's most well known economic and cultural exports. Turkey has become the world's fastest growing exporter of television series, surpassing Mexico and Brazil as the second-largest exporter of television series after the United States by the mid-2010s. The television industry has played a crucial role in increasing Turkey's popularity in Asia, Europe, Latin America, and North Africa.

Turkish series are chiefly produced in Istanbul, following the liberalization of private television in Turkey in the 1990s. Turkish television channels producing dramas include TRT, Kanal D, Show TV, Star TV, ATV, Fox, TV8, and Kanal 7. The Turkish television series market is characterized by intense local competition; out of the 60 series produced annually in the country, almost 50% do not run for longer than 13 episodes due to the strong competition among local channels, which results in the high quality and popularity of the longer-running productions. Each episode of a Turkish drama is typically between 120 and 150 minutes in length, excluding advertisements. However, this does not apply to internet platform series. 

Çalıkuşu was the first Turkish TV series to be exported internationally in 1986 to the Soviet Union. Turkish television shows are almost always available in multiple languages, dubbed or subtitled to accommodate the target country's language. The success of Turkish television series has also boosted tourism, as visitors are eager to visit the locations used in their favorite shows. The sudden and massive international popularity of Turkish TV dramas since the 2000s has been widely analyzed as a social phenomenon.

Production

	
	

The average season length of a Turkish drama is around 35-40 episodes. New episodes are filmed 6 days a week to keep up with the demanding production schedule, and crews can work up to 18 hours a day.

Episodes are generally much longer than those of Western series, with 60% of series running between 120 and 180 minutes per episode including advertisements. When Turkish series are run in other markets such as the Balkans and southeastern Europe, episodes are usually split into shorter segments, usually not exceeding more than 60 minutes.

History 

Turkey's first TV series was produced in 1974. The series was called Aşk-ı Memnu, which was adapted from the eponymous 1899 novel by Halid Ziya Uşaklıgil. The series was released on TRT, the public broadcaster of Turkey. The period of TV dramas on just TRT continued until 1986, being referred to in Turkey as the "single channel period" and the shows themselves being called the "old TRT series". TRT was known for its adaptations of Turkish classic novels into historical TV mini-series.

Turkish Yeşilçam films, were more popular at the time. Yeşilçam stars didn't play in TV series. 1970s was the golden age of Yeşilçam. Yeşilçam was the world's 4th biggest cinema. A support actor played in 3 films in a day. Yeşilçam movies are known for iconic unforgetten songs. Soundtrack songs are still widely successful.

Other Turkish TV channels appeared in the 1990s, and TV production increased as a result.

Turkish TV series produced between 2000 and 2005 were between 60 and 80 minutes in length. Scenarists couldn't finish scripts on time. Before more soundtrack music added scenes. Soundtrack music were widely successful. Turkish TV series changed a long music video clip. 
 	
Turkish TV series in 2005–2010 were, on average, 90 minutes in length. TV series became more popular than Turkish cinema, which mostly consisted of festival movies and comedy movies. Adaptations of Turkish classic novels began to be produced. Authors whose works were commonly adapted included Reşat Nuri Güntekin, Orhan Kemal, Halid Ziya Uşaklıgil, Peyami Safa, Ayşe Kulin, Ahmet Ümit, Nermin Bezmen, Hande Altaylı, and Elif Şafak. However, these adaptations usually transformed the stories from their late 18th- 20th-century settings to contemporary times. Book sales increased 10-fold, but these adaptations were not popular among authors and literary critics. One critic stated, "You imagine that Madame Bovery or Anna Karenina is in a shopping mall. It's terrible. The adaptations aren't literary. There weren't historical places, political, sociological. Characters of Turkish classic change or don't die. Classic political novel changes only love story".

In the 2010s, series ranged from 120 to 150 minutes in length on average. One episode of Turkish TV series is like a movie. It's period drama, modern-absurd comedy, crime, romantic-comedy. The most watched comedy series were Avrupa Yakası (2004–2009), Leyla ile Mecnun (2011–2013), Kardeş Payı (2014–2015), İşler Güçler (2012–2013), 1 Erkek 1 Kadın (2008–2015), Yalan Dünya (2012–2014), Tatlı Hayat (2001–2004) and Belalı Baldız (2005–2006).

Streaming 
Turkish streaming opened in ends of 2010s. They are BluTv, Exxen, Gain, Puhu Tv, Turkcell Tv.

Netflix 
Since late 2010s American streaming service Netflix has been producing original Turkish dramas and movies available on its platform. Netflix created its first original Turkish series, The Protector, with the release date on December 14, 2018. According to Nick Vivarelli of Variety, Netflix is the only streaming platform to buy substantial amounts of Turkish television series. Fatma, Love 101, 50m2, Paper Lives, Ethos, Rise of Empires: Ottoman, The Gift, Have You Ever Seen Fireflies?, Last Summer, One-Way to Tomorrow, Stuck Apart, Leyla Everlasting are among the Netflix productions that gathered success in Turkey as well as many other countries. There is a special category, "Turkish Movies & TV", on Netflix.

Turkish drama, The Club, was watched for a total of 7,860,000 hours during the week of 8–14 November, ranking 8th on Netflix's non-English language series list, thus making it one of the top 10 most-watched series. The Turkish production (Love Tactics) ranked first in the non-English films category of the February 14–20 list. Love Tactics watched 16,860,000 hours in its second week in the Global Top 10. The Turkish production (In Good Hands) ranked second in the non-English films category of the March 21–27 Netflix Global list. Yakamoz S-245 ranked third on Netflix Top 10 Global Non-English Tv Series category of the April 18–24 week and ranked fifth on the April 25-May 1 week. Yolun Acik Olsun (Godspeed) ranked eighth on Netflix Top 10 Global Non-English Films category of the May 23–29 week. As The Crow Flies ranked second on Netflix Top 10 Global Non-English Tv Series category of the June 6–12 week. Turkish movie, Doom of Love ranked fifth in the non-English films category of the June 20–25 week.

Spanish remake, Alba, of Turkish drama, Fatmagul’un Suçu Ne?, ranked first on the Global Non-English Tv Series category of the July 18–24, 2022 week. Another Self entered Netflix’s Global Non-English Tv Series list at number 5 with 18,100,000 hours of viewing in its first 4 days of July 25–31, 2022 week. Drama was also the first Turkish series to enter the Netflix list in the UK. Another Self ranked second in the Global Non-English Tv Series category of August 1–7, 2022 week. Turkish movie, Heartsong, ranked ninth in the Global Non-English Movies category of August 4–14, 2022 week. Another Self ranked third Global Non-English Tv Series list with 21,990,000 hours of viewing of the August 8–14, 2022 week.

Adapted from a Turkish scenario, Spanish production If Only, ranked eighth  in the Global Non-English Tv series category of OCTOBER 24 - OCTOBER 30, 2022 week.
Kal (Don't Leave) ranked ninth in the Global Non-English Films category of November 7-13 week.

Hot Skull ranked eight in the Global Non-English Tv series category of December 5-11 week.

Shahmaran ranked second in the Global Non-English Tv Series category of January 23-29 week.

Disney Plus 
The first Turkish original drama for Disney Plus, Kaçış, aired on June 14, 2022. Dünyayla Benim Aramda became the second Turkish drama aired in the platform.

International popularity

Asia

Afghanistan

Turkish TV series dubbed in Dari Persian have become very popular in Afghanistan, ratings going higher than the traditional Indian TV series that Afghans watched. TOLO, a TV station in Afghanistan. The most popular Turkish show is Fatmagül'ün Suçu Ne? (What is Fatmagül's Fault?). Another series as Öyle Bir Geçer Zaman Ki (As Time Goes By), Beni Affet (Forgive Me), Effet, Aşk-ı Memnu (Forbidden Love), and Adını Feriha Koydum are popular too. In 2015, is reported that the four Turkish series most successful around the world are Muhteşem Yüzyıl, Fatmagül'ün Suçu Ne?, Aşk-ı Memnu and Binbir Gece. Also, the most popular Turkish actor around the world is Halit Ergenç, and the most popular Turkish actress around the world is Beren Saat.

Arab world 

Turkish TV series began to rise in popularity across the Arab world in 2008, when Waleed bin Ibrahim Al Ibrahim began buying up Turkish series for his Middle East Broadcasting Center. MBC is a popular Saudi Arabian broadcasting network. Instead of dubbing the shows in classical Arabic, they were rendered in Syrian Arabic, a dialectal variant readily understood by ordinary viewers across the Middle East.

In a survey carried out in 16 Middle Eastern countries by the Turkish Economic and Social Studies Foundation, three out of four of those surveyed said they had seen a Turkish television series. Turkish series are in demand in the Arab world. They are prevalent on Egyptian television, and are popular among women in particular.

Led by Gümüş (known as Noor in the Arab market), a wave of Turkish melodramas made their way onto Arab televisions, wielding a kind of soft power. The show violated the local conservative cultural norms, showing some Muslim characters drinking wine with dinner and engaging in premarital sex. The Arabic-dubbed finale of the Turkish TV series Gümüş (Silver), aired on August 30, 2008, was watched by 85 million viewers. In 2008, the grand mufti of Saudi Arabia Abdulaziz al-Sheikh issued a fatwa against channels that broadcast Gümüş, saying anyone who broadcast it was "an enemy of God and his Prophet". First Turkish dramas aired in the Arab world were Cemberimde Gul Oya, Kaybolan Yıllar, Annem, Asi, Berivan, Bıçak Sırtı, Kurtlar Vadisi, Elveda Derken, Menekşe ile Halil, Yabanci Damat and Yılan Hikayesi. Another Turkish hit drama in the first period was Ihlamurlar Altında which made Tuba Büyüküstün a star in the region.

In 2013, the most popular Turkish shows were Fatmagül'ün Suçu Ne?, Aşk-ı Memnu and Muhteşem Yüzyıl.

Fatmagül'ün Suçu Ne? has increased the popularity in Istanbul as a tourist destination among Arabs. In 2015, Küçük Gelin was very popular, it was made by Samanyolu TV but unfortunately Samanyolu TV was shut down so Küçük Gelin didn't have a proper ending. Some Turkish series are more appealing to women, while some action series attract male audiences, which helps attract different types of advertisers for different viewerships. Some series have political overtones, including Ayrılık, which depicts the daily life of Palestinians under Israeli military occupation. Despite this, Islamic conservatives in many Middle Eastern countries have condemned certain Turkish series as "vulgar" and "heretical" to Islam.

In March 2018, MBC pulled all Turkish dramas off the air. Nick Vivarelli of Variety considers this a result of the political tensions between Saudi Arabia and Turkey. The head of the Turkish Sales Company Global Agency, Izzet Pinto, made a statement to say that he believed this was a political decision against the Turkish government.

In 2019, Tunisian-Algerian TV series named Mashaer was the first Arabic TV series to be broadcast with Turkish team in script and directing in order to benefit from the success of Turkish TV series in attracting followers in Arab countries.

An Arab adaptation of the Turkish drama Bride from Istanbul was remaked as 'Bride from Beirut' for MBC in 2019. An Arabic remake, E Alhulwat Walmara,
of Turkish drama, Iyı Gunde Kotu Gunde, was made in 2021. MBC linked Arab digital platform, Shahid, still showing Turkish dramas despite the tension. During Ramadan in 2020 and 2021, channels broadcast many Turkish series in Lebanon.

Hab Mlouk, Algerian-Tunisian remake of Turkish drama, Afili Aşk, aired in April 2022.

Arabic remake, Stiletto, of Turkish Drama, Ufak Tefek Cinayetler aired on MBC in 2022. The shooting of Arabic remake was done in Istanbul, Turkey; filmed at the same locations in the original Turkish version. The director was also Turkish, Ender Emir.  

MBC Group has signed a five-year output and co-development deal with Medyapim and fellow Turkish prodco Ay Yapim, in October 2022. It also includes a pact to exchange knowhow and co-develop original Arabic-language content for the MENA region, to be filmed in Saudi Arabia.

Arabic remake, Al Thaman, of Turkish drama, Bincir Gece, aired on MBC 1 in 2023.

Armenia
Turkish drama, Ezel, was remade under the name, Ancanoty, by Shant TV, one of the biggest channels in Armenia. The Armenian adaptation of the Turkish series Kara Sevda was broadcast under the name "Kayaran". Turkish series are also watched in the Armenian diaspora in Russia and elsewhere.

Bangladesh

In Bangladesh, Turkish series started becoming popular by the entrance of Muhteşem Yüzyıl. The show was renamed as Sultan Suleiman and it aired on the newcomer channel Deepto TV which was launched in November 2015 and started its broadcasting activity by telecasting first and second episode of this serial as the channels first opening program. It was the first Turkish drama series aired in Bangladeshi television. Through this program, the channel as well as the show acquired 2nd highest TRP by the first week of January and marvelously got the 1st place in the TRP ratings of viewers by the second week among all the Bangladeshi TV channels.
After one year of the highly successful running of Muhtesem Yuzyil, several channels started broadcasting other Turkish series's such as Diriliş: Ertuğrul on Maasranga Television and Ask-i Memnu on Channel I. Diriliş: Ertuğrul has gained so much popularity that the show has acquired highest TRP ratings of viewers in 2017–2018. .

India

In September 2015, the first Turkish drama on Indian television was Adını Feriha Koydum (Feriha) aired on Zindagi had become a huge success. The reason behind its success is a powerful story and natural acting by all the artists The third and final season Adını Feriha Koydum, was broadcast for the first time in India between 16 November 2016 to 15 December 2016 at 6 pm under the title "Feriha-New Season" by Zindagi because of overwhelming audience request. However, the show Aşk-ı Memnu (Paabandh Ishq) was also aired on Rishtey in Hindi but on international version of Rishtey like in United States, Europe and Asia. In India, Aşk-ı Memnu does not broadcast by the Rishtey till now. Fatmagul'ün Suçu Ne? is also extremely well received and appreciated by India audiences. The show also helped Zindagi to become the number one premium entertainment channel, garnering impressive ratings. The viewership of the channel increased due to this show. The reason behind it is talented actors, good looking faces, realistic and scenic locales besides good storyline. Kuzey Güney, Adını Feriha Koydum, Aşk Laftan Anlamaz,  Little Lord are a most demanded show in India and also highest rated show in India. From 25 June 2018 the Star Plus started broadcasting Kış Güneşi as its channel first Turkish show dubbed in Hindi language.

Kya Qusoor Hai Amala Ka, an Indian adaptation of the Turkish drama series Fatmagül'ün Suçu Ne?, was released in 2017. Indian remake, Dil Sambhal Jaa Zara, of Turkish drama, Ask-i Memnu, was aired in 2017.

Recently in 2018 MX PLAYER started streaming Turkish shows dubbed in Hindi for free. Day Dreamer, Endless Love, Cennet, New Bride, Brave and Beautiful, The Girl Named Feriha, Our Story (Bizim Hikaye), The Promise (Yemin) are also very well received by audience.

Binbir Gece will get an Indian remake. Indian remake aired as Kathaa Ankahee on Sony Entertainment Television.

Iran

Ironically IRIB was the one that started everything off. IRIB TV3 used to air Sırlar Dünyası (Persian: کلید اسرار) which had very meaningful stories about things that may happen to you. This show was nothing like Turkish shows nowadays and instead promoted love and faith, it's been said that this show had more fans in Iran than in Turkey. After that Turkish shows got extremely popular in Iran during the early 2010s. They were dubbed into Persian by various satellite channels led by GEM TV. Among the most popular series were Muhteşem Yüzyıl, Aşk-ı Memnu, Sırlar Dünyası and Fatmagül'ün Suçu Ne. The loss of popularity in Turkish shows are because in recent years satellite channels that used to air these Turkish shows have been unstable and their dubs have gone down in quality. In addition to that the Iranian government has tried to stop the popularity of these shows by producing much more content itself and also by lifting restrictions on the country's private sector of entertainment where institutions like TGPCO, Honar Aval and TDH Film have been able to make movies and TV Shows more freely. Turkish shows are also simply too long to fit into the Iranian day-to-day life and have also been accused of promoting disloyalty, anger and backstabbing.

Turkish series are still popular in Iran via internet.
Some of the Azerbaijanis, the largest ethnic minority in Iran, do not need subtitles to watch Turkish series due to language intelligibility.

Israel
The first Turkish TV series broadcast in Israel was "Menekşe ile Halil" in 2011. The series, They were which was broadcast in dubbed into Hebrew, was broadcast five days a week during prime-time on Viva. The Turkish series Bride from Istanbul reached high ratings in Israel, especially among women. The star of the series, Özcan Deniz gave concerts in Israel and Berkay Hardal acted in commercials in Israel.

Pakistan

Turkish series are also popular in Pakistan. Aşk-ı Memnu, which has broken ratings records in Turkey, aired on the television channel Urdu1 in Pakistan, and has topped ratings being the most successful Turkish series there. The first most popular series is Fatmagül'ün Suçu Ne? that aired on the same channel, the third best television series is Muhteşem Yüzyıl (Magnificent Century). According to Pakistani rating network, Media Logic, Aski-Memnu was watched by more than 90 million people on its last episode where as It averaged 45–55 million viewership from rural and urban market. 
Moreover, Fatmagül'ün Suçu Ne? and Adını Feriha Koydum averaged 30 million and 28 million viewership respectively from rural and urban market. No Turkish or Indian program received higher viewership after 2013. After URI Attack, Urdu1 banned Indian content and broadcast Kösem Sultan. The series opened with higher viewership, after three years the Turkish content begin its demand after Kosem Sultan's premier.

Popularity of the Turkish serials was met by some difficulties: Pakistan's entertainment industry complained that the airing of Turkish and other foreign TV series diverts funding from local productions. Furthermore, A senate committee that oversees information and broadcasting has condemned such shows for their allegedly "vulgar content" and contrary to the Pakistan's Muslim traditions.
It was also reported that TV series Aşk-ı Memnu, Fatmagül'ün Suçu Ne?, Muhtesem Yuzyil and Adını Feriha Koydum have aired once again after its ending due to immense popularity and major demands. See TV has played a number of Turkish dramas dubbed in Urdu like Ekip1 as Team1, Ötesiz İnsanlar as "Alif", Küçük Gelin as Masoom Dulhan Kucuk.

Hum Sitaray aired season 1 of highest-rated TRT 1 drama Diriliş: Ertuğrul. The story of the father of Osman, founder of the Ottoman Empire. The same drama, Ertugrul, is also being aired on PTV Home, a state-owned entertainment channel from Thursdays to Sundays. It is being watched and its popularity has since risen when PM Imran Khan told Pakistani Public to watch this show. Urdu1 aired Bizim Hikaye, Acil Aşk Aranıyor  and Seven Ne Yapmaz in November 2019. The rise of Turkish Content on YouTube in Pakistan began when Kanal D signed up an exclusive worldwide deal with Dot Republic Media for the distribution of their content in the Urdu language. For the first time, multiple titles were broadcast on YouTube in parallel to the TV Channels including Güneşin Kızları as Sunehri Titliyaan (aired on Play TV), Şeref Meselesi as Aabroo (aired on APlus), Siyah Beyaz Aşk as Sawal e Ishq (aired on Play TV), Afili Aşk as Tera Mera Pyar (aired on Play TV), Tatlı Intikam as Ek Haseen Intiqam (aired on Urdu 1). These dramas were aired on Dramas Central, Turkish Dramas Channel, and Best Pakistani Dramas YouTube channels. Aşk Laftan Anlamaz as Pyaar Lafzon Mein Kahan is one of the most-watched series in Pakistan, it has 46 million viewership on its first episode. In Pakistan, it was aired on Filmazia (now LTN Family). People also watched this series from India and Bangladesh. Currently Diriliş: Ertuğrul, Yunus Emre and Aşk Laftan Anlamaz are most popular Turkish series in Pakistan.

Turkic countries 

There is varying levels of mutual intelligibility among the various Turkic languages, especially among Turkish and Azerbaijani, which are both Oghuz languages. Thus, in Azerbaijan, the shows are not subtitled as the content of the show is understandable by the general public. Turkish shows are also aired in the Turkish-speaking de facto independent state of Northern Cyprus.

Turkic languages more distant from Turkish, such as Turkmen, Kazakh, Kyrgyz and Uzbek, require subtitles as they have lesser degree of mutual intelligibility. Turkish TV series are popular in the Turkic countries of Central Asia.
Uzbek remake of Turkish drama Kirgin Çiçekler aired as Бир ками тўлмаган дунё in 2015.

South Korea
In 2017, the Turkish series Fi was sold to GTV channel in South Korea. In 2021, Kırmızı Oda was sold for the South Korean channel, Kuki TV. Ezel won the Special Award in the Drama category at the 7th Seoul International Drama Awards. Medcezir won the Silver Award for Best Drama at the 9th Seoul International Drama Awards. Kara Sevda won the Special Jury Award in the Drama category at the 10th Seoul International Drama Awards held in South Korea. Engin Akyürek received the "Best Actor" award at the 10th Seoul International Drama Awards. Kerem Bürsin won the "Best Actor" award at the 12th Seoul International Drama Awards. Turkish drama, Çarpışma, won the Silver Award in the Best Drama category at the 14th Seoul International Drama Awards. The Pit won the Special Jury Award at the 16th Seoul International Drama Awards. At the 17th Seoul Drama Awards, two Turkish dramas 'Destan' and 'Mahkum' won the 'Best Series Award'.

Indonesia
Paramparça aired on ANTV. The Turkish series Kirgın Çicekler was broadcast on Indonesia's ANTV channel and became the 'Most Watched' production by female viewers aged 20–29. Turkish drama, Elif, aired in Indonesia and local remake was made as Elif Indonesia on SCTV.

Thailand
Barb Ayuttitham, Thai remake of Turkish drama, Ölene Kadar, aired in 2021.

Malaysia
The first Turkish series broadcast on Malaysian National Channel RTM was "Bu Şehir Arkandan Gelecek". Malaysian remake of Turkish drama, Rüzgarın Kalbi, aired as Degup Cinta in 2020.

Philippines
In 2018, GMA Network from the Philippines aired the first Turkish drama, Bana Sevmeyi Anlat (as Wings of Love). ETC channel also aired Ewerywhere I Go, Endless Love (Kara Sevda) and Aşk Laftan Anlamaz.

Japan
Magnificent Century aired on Channel Ginga as オスマン帝国外伝～愛と欲望のハレム〜 in Japan.  The Japanese Nippon Tv has acquired the rights of the Turkish drama series Anne, a remake of Japanese drama Mother; the Turkish remake, Anne, will air on BS Nippon TV and Hulu in Japan. Turkish drama Kadın, a remake of Japanese drama Woman, won the Special Award (Foreign dramas) at the Tokyo Drama Awards.

Vietnam
Magnificent Century aired in Vietnam as Thời đại hoàng kim. Cesur ve Güzel aired on HTV7.

Europe

Balkans
Turkish TV shows are widely successful all over the Balkan Region. The most watched show in Bosnia and Herzegovina was Muhteşem Yüzyıl (Magnificent Century). In Kosovo, the most popular TV shows in December 2012 were Fatmagül'ün Suçu Ne? (What is Fatmagül's Fault?), which ranked top of all programmes and Aşk ve Ceza (Love and Punishment), which came in third according to data by Index Kosova. In Serbia, research from January 2013 indicates that the top two Turkish shows in TV were Muhteşem Yüzyıl, which ranked fourth, and Öyle Bir Geçer Zaman Ki (As Time Goes By), which came in seventh. Serbian sociologist Ratko Božović explains this popularity by pointing at the traditional, patriarchal values of the Turkish shows, and the many cultural and linguistic similarities between Turkey and the Balkan countries: "The mentality depicted in those shows has to do with a traditional understanding of morality that people in Balkans remember at some level". According to him, all Balkan countries (Serbia, Bosnia-Herzegovina, Kosovo, North Macedonia, Albania, Croatia etc.) have seen dramatic changes in terms of family life, and the Turkish shows help them recall value systems that now seem lost.

In North Macedonia, Öyle Bir Geçer Zaman Ki (As Time Goes By) ranked in January 2013 the top in terms of viewers, according to Nielsen Media Research. In fact, Turkish shows are so successful in North Macedonia that the government has passed a bill to restrict broadcasts of Turkish series during the day and at prime time in order to reduce the Turkish impact on North Macedonia's society.

They are also widely watched by Bulgarian viewers. Nova Televizia broke the record for viewer numbers when it started broadcasting the Turkish TV series Binbir Gece. The channel then decided to broadcast another Turkish show, Dudaktan Kalbe.

The series Binbir Gece (One Thousand and One Nights) became a primetime hit in Bosnia, Montenegro and North Macedonia, as well as in Romania, Albania and Greece. 
It has increased the popularity of Istanbul as a tourist destination among Croatians, and led to a greater interest in learning Turkish. Other Turkish series that achieved great popularity in Croatia are Ezel starring Kenan İmirzalıoğlu and Cansu dere (2009-2011), Muhteşem Yüzyıl Halit Ergenc and Meryem Uzerli (2011-2014), Fatmagül'ün Suçu Ne? starring Engin Akyürek and Beren Saat (2010-2012), Adını Feriha Koydum Hazal Kaya and Çağatay Ulusoy (2011-2012), Kuzey Güney (2011-2013) starring Kıvanç Tatlıtuğ, Buğra Gülsoy and Öykü Karayel, Dila Hanım, Küçük Sırlar (2010-2011) and most recently Behzat Ç. Bir Ankara Polisiyesi (2010-2013).

In Slovakia, the popularity of Turkish series has improved the public image of Turkey itself.

According to Kosovo's index the most popular TV series there is Fatmagül'ün Suçu Ne? Fatmagül'ün Suçu Ne? has been sold by 124 countries,  Kara Para Aşk sold by 112 countries. Sıla sold by 104 countries. Ezel sold by 100 are series that has been sold by over 100 countries.

Greece
Turkish TV series were also popular in Greece until their widespread removal from Greek TV in 2020 due to Turkish incursions into Greek territorial waters. As of 2021 only Elif continues to be aired (since early 2018), with low ratings, while from 2018-19 the popularity of Turkish drama in Greece has largely faded, because of the reemergence of Greek-language programming and awareness against Turkish-language TV programs, given the negative opinion about Turkey in Greece. The Greek orthodox Bishop Anthimos had criticised Greek fans of Turkish TV series after Yabancı Damat (The Foreign Bridesgroom) was one of the first Turkish series to become popular in Greece in 2005. According to International Hellenic Association in Delaware is monitoring the broadcast of Turkish drama in Greece, certain companies such as Procter and Gamble provide a large amount of advertising at the Turkish drama in Greece. Generally Turkish dramas have been met with criticism in Greece for many years.

Yabanci Damat started airing in Greece on July 11, 2005, recording a viewing rate of 31.7%; the last episode aired on July 5, 2008, recording a viewing rate of 31.8%. One Thousand and One Nights started broadcasting on June 7, 2010 by ANT1, recording a viewership rate of 18.7%. The last episode aired on February 1, 2011, scoring 24.3%, while the highest percentage was 43.8% on August 6, 2010. Another popular drama was Sila; it aired in Greece on June 10, 2012 by MEGA. The series "Elif" had a particularly significant average viewership share, 16.8% of all viewers, it was watched daily by an average of about 450,000 viewers.

Greek remake, Trapped, of Turkish drama, Yargı, will air on ANT1. Another Greek remake, Storgi, of Turkish Drama, Kirmizi Oda, will air on Skai Tv.

Romania
The series, Ezel, was adapted by Romanian TV channel Pro TV under the title Vlad. Turkish drama, O Hayat Benim, was remade by Romanian channel as Adela in 2020. Fructul oprit, a Romanian adaptation of Ask-i Memnu was also produced by Antena 1 in 2018. The Romanian remake, The Clan, of the Turkish drama, İçerde,  will air by the Romanian Pro TV.

Spain

After Latin America success, there is great interest in Turkish TV series in Spain. The Spanish Telenovela channel started broadcasting the TV series 'Fatmagül'ün Suçu Ne' in 2018, and the series became the most watched series of the channel. After the TV series "Fatmagul", the Spanish channel began to air Turkish series like "Kara Para Ask", "Elif", "Ezel", "Sila", "Medcezir", "Anne", "One Thousand and One Nights" and "The Girl Named Feriha". At the same time, the series "Fatmagül'ün Suçu Ne" adapted as Alba by the Spanish Atresmedia.

Turkish dramas; Kadın (as Mujer), Sen Çal Kapımı, Erkenci Kuş, Kızım, Bir Zamanlar Çukurova (as Tierra Amarga) and Sadakatsiz (Infiel) received high ratings on different channels in Spain. Kadin (Mujer) was the first Turkish series aired in prime time in Spain, it has managed to lead its time slot for a year, even facing great products and being broadcast for several days in a row. Sadakatsiz aired in Spain with an average audience of 2.3 million viewers, which makes it one of the foreign series with the best debut since 2020 Caner Cindoruk was on the cover of Spain's "Albacete A Mano" magazine for the promotion of the TV series "Sadakatsiz".

While it was being produced by Turkish Netflix, the series, Eğer Bilseydim, whose production was not made due to censorship, written by Ece Yörenç, will be broadcast by Spanish Netflix under the name of Si lo Hubiera Sabido.

The TV series Sen Çal Kapımı, broadcast on the Spanish channel Divinity, reached 460,000 viewers and reached 4.9 percent in Share. Thus, Sen Çal Kapımı became the most watched program of the channel. Another Turkish series, Early Bird, broadcast by the channel before, broke the record by reaching 427,000 viewers.

Spanish remake of Turkish drama, Anne, will air as Heridas on Atresmedia. Another Spanish remake of Turkish drama, Son, aired as El Accidente on Telecinco in 2017.

THE MEDIAPRO STUDIO and MEDYAPIM established their Spanish-Turkish co-production company in 2022, focusing making Spanish remakes of Turkish dramas.

'Sadakatsiz' premiered with a powerful 18.1% rating on Antena 3 and 2,357,000 viewers and, it was the leader every Sunday and moves around a 14-15% share in Spain. The final episode of Kızım (as Mi hija) aired as the most watched series on Antena 3 with an average of more than 2.4 million viewers and a 16.8% share,  also placed it as a leader on Sunday nights.

Çilek Kokusu will be broadcast by Mediaset Spain's Divinity channel under the name "Com olor a fresas". The series will be broadcast every weekday. The same channel bought the broadcasting rights for Spain of Bu Şehir Arkandan Gelecek and Kaderimin Oyunu.

Mitele Plus, the digital broadcasting platform of Mediaset Spain, acquired Kanal D Drama channel, which broadcasts Turkish series. Thus, a selection of approximately 1200 episodes was added to the platform as Spanish dubbed. Mitele made a similar deal with the Timeless Dizi Channel (TDC), which broadcasts Turkish series in October 2021.

Antena 3 became the most watched channel in prime time on Sunday, October 9, with the premiere of the new Turkish series, Yargı. Then another Turkish drama, 'Sadakatsiz' shot up to 21.6% and 1,607,000 in the late night slot on the same channel.

Yasak Elma (The Forbidden Apple), which was broadcast under the name "Pecado Original" on Antena 3, received a share of 15% in its own time slot and made the best TV series premiere of the last ten years.

Italy

'Cherry Season' was the first Turkish TV series to be broadcast in Italy and received high ratings on Canale 5. Turkish TV series such as 'Dolunay' and 'Erkenci Kuş' made Can Yaman an idol in Italy. Fan clubs were established for the duo of Can Yaman and Demet Özdemir. The actors of the Early Bird and Cherry Season series participated in talk shows in Italy. The series starring Kerem Bürsin and Hande Erçel in 'Canale 5' was broadcast under the name 'Love is in the Air'.

The first episode of "Sevgili Geçmiş" was watched by 2 million 472 thousand people on Canale 5 with 13.4 percent in primetime and took the first place.
Turkish TV series Brave & Beautiful met with the audience on July 5 in Italy on Canale 5.

The broadcasting rights of Once Upon a Time in  Çukurova were purchased by Italian Mediaset.

Russia
The first popular Turkish TV series in Russia was Çalıkuşu, broadcast in 1986. Kurt Seyit ve Şura was broadcast on Russia's Domashny television channel in 2015. Magnificent Century (Великолепный век) was shown on the Domanshi channel in 2012. Even though the Turkish series called "Sultan of my Heart" was not successful in Turkey, was broadcast on Channel 1, Russia's largest channel, in 2019 and it took place at number one as the most watched TV series in Russia. Siyah Beyaz Aşk was aired in Russia on the Domashniy channel. Anne, Kara Sevda, Kara Para Aşk and Meryem aired in Russia as well. Kara Sevda gained the popularity in Russia. Russian viewers enjoyed watching not only the original episode, but also reruns of Kara Sevda. Marina Hripunova, General Manager of Russian Domashniy television channel, said, "We cannot do without Turkish TV series. Turkish TV series are watched with great interest in Russia." Turkish star Tuba Büyüküstün became the face of Russian mobile operator, Megafon, in 2021.

Russian remake of Turkish drama, Paramparça, aired in 2018 as Oskolki (Осколки) on WeIT Media.

Ukraine
Magnificent Century aired on Ukraine Channel 1+1 in 2012 as well. As of August 2017, Kara Sevda, with the name "Нескінченне кохання" in Ukraine, started to be broadcast on 1+1, the Ukrainian television. Ukrainian remake of Turkish drama, Ezel , aired as Uznay menya, esli smozhesh (Узнай меня, если сможешь) in 2014. Ukrainian remake of Turkish drama Siyah Beyaz Aşk was made as Na tvoey storone (На твоей стороне)
in 2019

France
Turkish series; Kara Sevda, Ölene Kadar, Fatmagül'ün Suçu Ne?, and Bu Şehir Arkandan Gelecek, were broadcast on Africa-based Novelas TV, which also broadcasts in France. Fatmagül'ün Suçu Ne? was selected as the Best Foreign Series at the Soap Awards in 2019.  7. Koğuştaki Mucize became the most watched movie in Netflix France and thus took the title of the first Turkish movie that was watched the most on Netflix France.

Slovenia 
Turkish series are also popular in Slovenia. They are broadcast by Planet TV and POP TV. You could watch Kara Sevda, Sen Çal Kapımı, Erkenci Kuş, Bay Yanli ...

Sweden 
The Swedish public broadcaster SVT acquired the series Son (The End), becoming the first major broadcaster in Western Europe to buy a Turkish TV series in 2013. According to Sweden's television critic, Anders Björkman, the series, Son, was the best foreign show this season in all categories.

Netherlands
Son was remade in 2016 on KRO-NCRV, one of the leading Dutch television channels, under the name Vlucht HS13 (Flight HS13). Thus, it became the first Turkish TV series adapted in Western Europe.

United States
Turkish drama, Suskunlar was remade as Game of Silence on NBC. Turkish drama, Son, has been sold to 20th Century Fox Television in the United States and was adapted into a pilot named Runner for ABC. On November 20, 2017, Kara Sevda won an Emmy for Best Telenovela of the Year. Turkish actor Haluk Bilginer was selected as the 'Best Actor' for his role in the TV series, Şahsiyet, at the 47th International Emmy Awards. Turkish crime drama, Alef, was selected in Variety's "Top 15 International TV Series of 2020" list. The BluTV and FX special production "Alef" won the "best crime drama" and "best credits" awards at the New York Festivals in the USA.

Latin America 

Turkish dramas have become popular in Latin America after being dubbed into Spanish and Portuguese. Due to the popularity, new Turkish shows continue to be dubbed into Spanish and Portuguese. In 2017, 25% of the biggest 7 Turkish exporting companies' business came from Latin America.

The popularity of Turkish shows in Latin America has been credited to multiple factors. Burhan Gün, the president of the Turkish TV and Cinema Producers Guild, has stated that one reason is that Latin Americans and Turkish people can often look similar to each other. Gün has also expressed that Turkish shows portray storylines relating to migration patterns that are similar in many developing nations. Many shows portray plots about moving from rural areas to cities, and the challenges that come with this transition.

ATV has sold rights to air the series, Hercai, in various international markets, including most of Latin America and the United States through Telemundo, which premiered on June 22, 2021. Exathlon is a physical challenge reality show from Turkey that has inspired local versions of the show to be create in Latin America. Brazil and Mexico have each created their own version of the show, Exathlon Brazil and Exatlón México.

In 2020, Taner Ölmez, the lead actor of Miracle Doctor, won the "Best Foreign Actor" award at the Produ Awards, one of the most important awards of the television industry in Latin America. "Bir Zamanlar Çukurova" was announced as the "Best Foreign Series" and received one of the biggest awards at the Produ Awards. Vahide Perçin won the grand prize in the "Best Foreign Actress" category.

HBO opened a Turkish series category on its digital platform in Latin America. For this category, they agreed with Madd Entertainment from Turkey for 3 years; put 10 Turkish TV series in its catalog. Mucize Doktor became the most watched TV series on HBO Max as of October 2021. Sen Cal Kapimi ranked second in the Top 10 list on HBOMAXLA. It ranked first in Chile, Uruguay and Colombia, and third in Mexico and Argentina.

Chile 
In Chile, the most popular Turkish show is Binbir Gece, as it was the most watched show in 2014. The television channel "Mega", which started to show Turkish series for the first time in Chile, was saved from bankruptcy, thanks to the Turkish TV series Binbir Gece. Turkish TV series Sıla, which is broadcast in Chile, received as high a rating as the Copa America qualifying match between Brazil and Chile.

Brazil
The first Turkish TV series broadcast in Brazil was Binbir Gece on Band Tv. Then Fatmagul and Sila aired. "Sila" had the best first week rating of Turkish soap operas in Band. HBO Max Brasil launched its first Turkish soap opera, Sen Cal Kapimi, in the Brazilian catalog and the title won over subscribers, ranking 1st among the most watched productions on streaming.

Colombia
Tv series; "Cesur ve Güzel", "Fazilet Hanım ve Kızları", "Binbir Gece", "Kara Para Aşk", "Fatma Gül'ün Suçu Ne", "Adını Feriha Koydum", "Ezel", "Muhteşem Yüzyıl" and "Elif" broadcast in the country.

Argentina 
In Argentina the show Fatmagül'ün Suçu Ne? is extremely popular, with more than 12 million Argentine viewers watching each episode. Mucize Doktor, which started broadcasting on Argentina's number one channel Telefe, received a rating of 14.2 in its first episode, making it the second highest opening performance for a Turkish series. Two days later, on Wednesday, it reached the highest rating for a Turkish drama with a rating of 21.5.

Peru
Kanal D Drama, broadcasting in Spanish for Turkish series, has surpassed one million subscribers in Peru.

Mexico 
Adapted from the Turkish TV series, Kara Para Aşk, Imperio de Mentiras was broadcast on the Mexican Televisa channel. The Mexican adaptation of the Ezel was released in 2018 under the name Yago for Televisa. “El Asesino Del Olvido” the Mexican remake of the Turkish series Şahsiyet was aired. Remake of Gecenin Kraliçesi was broadcast on Las Esterellas as  "¿Te acuerdas de mí?" in 2021.

Hispanic community in the US 
Turkish drama Kara Sevda is broadcast in the United States through Univision, it became the most watched foreign soap opera in the entire history of the country and the Turkish series with the highest audience, surpassing its main competitors. The love story remains the most watched fiction in Hispanic prime time with more than 2 million viewers every day and close to 4 million in its final episode, something that no other series has achieved. Currently, Kara Sevda remains the most watched Turkish series in the United States.

A Spanish-language American remake titled Pasión prohibida of Turkish drama Aşkı Memnu began airing in 2013. Later, the Indian channel Star Plus broadcast the remake of this show as Dil Sambhal Jaa Zara.

The drama, Sefirin Kızı, made Univision the first U.S. network among Hispanic viewers in the weeknight 10 p.m. slot. The actress of Sefirin Kizi, Neslihan Atagül, was on the cover of the HOLA! USA for the promotion of the drama. The actor of Hercai, Akın Akınözü, was on the cover of HOLA! USA for the promotion of the another drama. Another Turkish star, Tuba Buyukustun, was on the cover of HOLA!USA for her key role in the global recognition of Turkish actors.

Elsewhere

As of 2016, Turkish soap operas are popular in Ethiopia, through Kana TV where they are dubbed into Amharic.
Turkish TV series started to gain popularity with the release of the Arabic-dubbed Turkish drama, Gümüş, in the Arab World. The Bride from Istanbul was a huge hit in Israel. Suskunlar (Game of Silence) became the first Turkish drama to be remade by the USA. Then Son was remade as Runner for ABC. Pasión prohibida was the first Spanish-language American remake of a Turkish drama, released in 2013. Many channels in Latin America have been broadcasting Turkish series and many local remakes aired. Son became the first Turkish TV series adapted in the Western Europe, having been adapted by Netherlands. Adını Feriha Koydum was the first Turkish drama success in India. Kya Qusoor Hai Amala Ka? was the first Indian remake of the popular Turkish drama, Fatmagül'ün Suçu Ne?, about a gang-raped girl's fight for justice. Fatmagül'ün Suçu Ne? also remade by Spain as Alba for Netflix. Elif Indonesia was the first remake of a Turkish drama in the Southeast Asia after the original show's popularity in Indonesia, in 2016. The first Malaysian remake of a Turkish drama, Rüzgarın Kalbi, aired in 2020. Barb Ayuttitham became the first Turkish remake in Thailand. Turkish TV series are broadcast in many countries in Europe, the Balkans, Russia, Middle East, and Asia.

Besides the original scripts; Korean, American, Japanese, and Bristish adaptations are also common. The original Turkish dramas are mostly based on Turkish classical books. Besides the TV series set in Istanbul, regional dramas about the Black Sea, Aegean and Southeast ("'töre' dizileri") are also common.
In addition to broadcasts on television, Turkish series are followed by fans on legal and illegal internet platforms in many different languages.

Storytelling of Turkish TV series

Recurring elements in Turkish TV series
Each episode of Turkish TV series is quite long, unlike European TV series of 45–60 minutes, Turkish TV series are 120–160 minutes long. Therefore, when they are published in abroad, they are published in two parts.
Soundtracks are given utmost importance to fill long episode times.
Generally, TV series are shot in Istanbul. 
A season of an average Turkish TV series is around 35-40 episodes. To keep up with the demanding production schedule, new episodes are filmed 6 days a week and crews can work up to 18 hours a day.
In Turkish TV series, especially romantic and drama series, the couple in love looks at each other many times or they stare into each other's faces without saying anything for minutes.
The leading roles do not die in Turkish TV series. When he dies, it means the series will end.
In Turkish TV series about school life, students break all kinds of school rules but they are not expelled from the school. There is always a teacher who understands what they do and approaches them with love.
In the summer series, the male lead is handsome, muscular and the holding boss. The girl he loves is clumsy, cute, poor but proud, working in his company. There is also the ex-girlfriend of the Man, who is trying to break things up.
Mother-in-law, stepmother, stepfather and ex-lover are bad-tempered people.
A person who is seriously ill needs to be treated abroad in order to recover, and this treatment is very expensive.
Although normally there are different police units dealing with each crime, in Turkish TV series a single police unit deals with all criminals.
In many serials, the image of the Bosphorus is used in the transition between scenes.
There is definitely a family that owns a holding and another family that owns a holding that rivals this family.
In Turkish TV series, mafia bosses, tycoons and bullies wear suits.
In TV series about the South East of the country, the tribe (aşiret) lives in a mansion and is rich and powerful. In tribal serials, one side is usually in pursuit of honor killing or blood feuds.
 The poor are proud; the rich are arrogant. Even at home, the rich always appear with the perfect outfit and make-up.
The woman working in the kitchen is always funny.
The lead male in the series always has a semi-philosophical mentor.

Censorship, bans and Self-Censorship in Turkish TV series
Television channels in Turkey are controlled by the Radio and Television Supreme Council. If RTUK detects that any channel is broadcasting obscene, illegal, disruptive or divisive content, the channel may be fined, suspended, or even closed by canceling the license of the channel. Therefore, TV channels have to pay attention to their content. Punishments are often given because the scene is against the general moral code. Generally, things that are forbidden are either not shown on television or shown by censorship. Often the boundaries of what is immoral are unclear and very personal. Therefore, what deserves punishment and what does not cause controversy. And for this reason, screenwriters have internalized self-censorship. There are complaints as to why the sensitivity to alcohol or sexuality issues is not shown on issues of abuse and violence scenes.

Cursing is censored in TV shows. Cursing is either suppressed by the beep or the sound is muted. If the curse is long, the scene may be cut completely.
Making love and kissing scenes are a sensitive subject. It is not forbidden to show, but the boundaries are not sharp either.
TV series are also shown by censoring alcohol, drugs and cigarettes, and encouraging the use of these substances is prohibited.
Homosexual intercourse is a sensitive subject.
Blood is also censored in TV series, scenes such as bloody and body dismemberment and extreme violence are prohibited.
Insulting and humiliating religion, nation, national values and state administrators is prohibited in TV series.

Strike

In 2010, a season of Turkish TV series was 30 to 35 episodes long. One 90-minute episode took 6 days to make. When TV series are broadcast, the next 3 to 4 episodes were shot concurrently. Actors and workers were on strike. So a Turkish TV series has generally has 2 crew concurrently.

In 2016, a season of Turkish TV series was 35 to 40 episodes long. It is between 120 and 150 minutes in length. Actors and crew members complained.

Each series roughly consists of 40 episodes that last about 130 minutes, which translates into 5,200 hours of domestic TV content broadcast yearly. Demiray commented that as a screenwriter, "it was wonderful until about 10 years ago. Then I had to write a 60-minute episode per week, as opposed to today's 130-plus minutes. It has become a very mechanical and uninteresting process, just a question of keeping the melodrama going."

Cagri Vila Lostuvali, 10 years in the business and four as a director, adds: "To deliver one episode per week our crews work up to 18 hours a day. This job eats up our entire lives."

According to Şükrü Avşar, one of the leading Turkish TV shows producers and director of Avşar Film, some episodes need between 15 and 20 days of work to get satisfying results.

Approximatively 36 episodes of different series are shot each week.

According to actor Yılmaz Erdoğan the length of episodes is the first weakness of the market. Another weakness is that many series do not last long due to the lack of audience. Therefore, Turkish TV series market has not yet reached maturity.

"With the increase of the episodes' duration and consequently the amount of working hours, the industry has lost its most experienced professionals who refuse to work in such conditions. Wages have not grown much either," said Meric.

To get a sense of proportion, it suffices to think about the process of developing a cinema script, which takes about two years and at least seven weeks to shoot 120 minutes of edited footage.

Values shown in Turkish series
For the Balkan region, the reason why Turkish shows became popular was showing lives lived in a healthy balance of Islam, democracy, modernity and traditionalism. They also lack violence and obscene language, as well as having easy-to-follow plots with realistic characters.  Tapping into nostalgia for a system of family values that people in the Balkan region have lost.

According to Izzet Pinto, the head of Istanbul-based powerhouse distributor Global Agency; it’s the “combination of family-based stories with big talents and directors, and great music” that attract audiences so widely, and Turkish culture as a whole, which he calls both “modern, but at the same time, also very traditional”.

For the Arab world, showing "modern Muslim" life was a remarkable factor. Contrary to showing elements that are not accepted in the region in Western shows, similar social problems are told within acceptable limits in Turkish TV series.

For the Latin America, the reason was similarities in culture, emphasis on family values, family viewing, good-looking people and real picturesque locales.

Brave women who do not keep silent and seek their rights by keeping their dignity are another remarkable element in the series. Fatmagül'ün Suçu Ne? was a brave story that fought to solve similar problems faced by women all over the world and has been successful in many countries.

Criticism

With taboo-breaking scenes that include premarital sex, love triangles and nudity, Turkish TV series have been dubbed as ‘immoral’ by some religious authorities in the Middle East and in some cases, they have even been banned.

Business and finance 
Turkish shows began expanding internationally in 1999, but only started to gain popularity in the early 21st century. In order to be able to produce high-quality content and to be competitive with the non-Turkish shows that were gaining traction in Turkey, more money was needed and the financial deficit was made up for through expansion to non-domestic markets. The Turkish government also played a role in motivating international expansion, creating incentive by granting awards and support to the companies that are most effective in exporting worldwide.

In 2017, Turkish TV exports earned 350 million U.S. dollars, officially marking the country as the second largest drama exporter in the world behind the United States. According to the Secretary General of the TEA, Bader Arslan, Turkey's yearly income from TV exports will exceed 1 billion U.S. dollars by 2023.
Turkish dizis are exported to approximatively 140 countries around the world.

Today, there are about 45 production companies and 150 active film directors in Turkey. Production cost of a series may vary between 78,000 and 520,000 U.S. dollars (for the most famous ones).

See also
 List of Turkish television series
 Television in Turkey

References

External links

Television drama
 
 
Television drama